Altes Stadthaus may refer to:
Altes Stadthaus, Berlin
Altes Stadthaus, Bonn
Altes Stadthaus, Dortmund